Luke Matthew Woolfenden (born 21 October 1998) is an English professional footballer who plays as a defender for Ipswich Town.

Woolfenden is a graduate of the Ipswich Town academy, making his senior debut in 2017. He spent time on loan at Bromley during the 2017–2018 season and Swindon Town during the 2018–2019 season. Primarily a centre back, he can also play as a right back.

Club career

Ipswich Town
Woolfenden joined the Ipswich Town academy at the age of 11. He became a full academy player with Town in July 2015, signing a two-year scholarship. He signed his first professional contract in June 2017, signing a one-year contract with the option of an additional year extension. He went on to make his full senior debut in a 2–0 win over Luton Town in the League Cup first round on 8 August 2017. In September 2017, Woolfenden signed a new contract with Ipswich, signing a two-year contract with the option of an additional one-year extension. On 28 April 2018, Woolfenden made his full Championship debut for Ipswich Town away to Reading. Ipswich went onto win the game 4–0, with Woolfenden playing the full game. He also came on as a substitute in the last game of the 2017–2018 season in a 2–2 home draw against Middlesbrough.

Bromley (loan)
In December 2017 he joined Bromley on a month's loan. He made his debut for Bromley against Macclesfield Town on 23 December. On 27 April 2018, Woolfenden was recalled from his loan spell at Bromley. He made 17 starts and three sub appearances, scoring once, for the Ravens having joined them just before Christmas.

Swindon Town (loan)
On 31 August 2018, Woolfenden joined League Two side Swindon Town on loan until the end of the season. He scored his first goal for the club in a 1–2 loss to Bury on 15 September 2018.  On 16 February 2019, Woolfenden signed a new 3-year contract with Ipswich, with the option of an additional years' extension. Woolfenden made 36 appearances in all competitions during his loan spell at the County Ground, scoring two goals.

Return to Ipswich

2019–20 season
After returning from loan, Woolfenden became a regular player for Ipswich during the 2019–20 season following relegation to League One the previous season. On 25 January 2020, he scored his first goal for the club, netting the winner in a 1–0 home win against Lincoln City at Portman Road. He made 36 appearances during his first full season in the Ipswich first-team. Woolfenden signed a new four-year contract with Ipswich on 1 July 2020, keeping him at the club until 2024, with the option of an additional year extension.

2020–21 season
Woolfenden was given the number 6 shirt for the 2020–21 season. He made his first appearance of the season in a 3–0 win over Bristol Rovers in an EFL Cup first round tie in the opening match of the season. He suffered a minor injury in training during the early part of the season, keeping him out of the team for the majority of September. He made his first league appearance of the season on 27 October, keeping a clean sheet in a 1–0 home win over Gillingham. Woolfenden scored his first goal of the season in a 2–0 win over Blackpool on 6 February.

Career statistics

References

External links
Luke Woolfenden profile at the Ipswich Town F.C. website

1998 births
Living people
Sportspeople from Ipswich
English footballers
Association football defenders
Ipswich Town F.C. players
Bromley F.C. players
Swindon Town F.C. players
English Football League players
National League (English football) players